The 1906 Rhode Island Rams football team represented the University of Rhode Island as an independent during the 1906 college football season. Led by ninth-year head coach Marshall Tyler, they finished the season with a record of 1–2–1.

Schedule

References

Rhode Island
Rhode Island Rams football seasons
Rhode Island Rams football